Martelella mediterranea is a Gram-negative, oxidase- and catalase-positive, strictly aerobic, non-spore-forming, non-motile bacteria from the genus of Martelella which was isolated from water sample from the Lake Martel on Mallorca in Spain.

References

External links
Type strain of Martelella mediterranea at BacDive -  the Bacterial Diversity Metadatabase

Hyphomicrobiales
Bacteria described in 2005